The Ministry of Transport and Communication of Armenia is a government ministry in Armenia. The head office is located in Yerevan.

Leadership
Between 2018 and 2021, the post of Minister had been held by Hakob Arshakyan. Since April 2021, Hayk Chobanyan assumed the post of Minister.

Departments
Departments within the ministry include the Transport Department, Department of Communication, Department of Post, Department of Information, the Railway Department, the Road Construction Department, the Financial-Economic and Accounting Department, the Legal Department, and the Foreign Relations and Programmes Department.

The Ministry also oversees the Armenian Space Agency and the Yerevan Metro.

See also

 Mass media in Armenia
 Road signs in Armenia
 Telecommunications in Armenia
 Transport in Armenia

References

External links
 Ministry of Transport and Communication
 Ministry of Transport and Communication 
 List of Ministers of the Ministry of Transport and Communication

Transport
Armenia
Armenia
Transport organizations based in Armenia